This is a list of islands of Solomon Islands, by province and archipelago.

Islands 
Choiseul Province
Choiseul Island
Taro Island
Vaghena Island (Vaglena, Wagina)
Western Province
Shortland Islands
Magusaiai
Alu Island (Shortland)
Pirumeri
Fauro Island
Masamasa
Ovau
Treasury Islands
Mono Island
Stirling Island
New Georgia Group
Vella Lavella
Mbava
Ranongga (Ghanongga) 
Simbo 
Ghizo Island
Kolombangara (Kilimbangara)
Vonavona
Kohinggo
New Georgia
Tetepare
Akara
Rendova
Vangunu
Penjuku
Nggatokae
Mborokua
Isabel Province
Santa Isabel
San Jorge
Central Province
Russell Islands
Nggela Islands (Florida Islands)
Nggela Sule (Florida Island)
Tulagi (Tulaghi)
Gavutu
Tanambogo
Savo Island
Guadalcanal Province
Guadalcanal
Malaita Province
Malaita
Maramasike (South Malaita, Small Malaita)
Mbasakana
Stewart Islands
Mutuavi
Faore
Tehaolei
Sikaiana
Ontong Java Atoll (Ongtong Java, Lord Howe Atoll)
Roncador Reef
Makira-Ulawa Province
Makira (San Cristobal)
Olu Malau Islands (Three Sisters Islands)
Malaulalo
Malaupaina
Ali'ite
Ulawa
Uki Ni Masi
Owaraha (Santa Ana)
Owariki (Santa Catalina)
Rennell and Bellona Province
Rennell
Bellona
Indispensable Reefs
North Reef
Middle Reef
Nottingham Islet
South Reef
Temotu Province
Santa Cruz Islands
Nendo (Ndeni, Nitendi, Ndende, Santa Cruz)
Temotu Neo (Malo)
Temotu Noi
Utupua
Vanikoro
Banie
Teanu (Tevai)
Tinakula
Reef Islands
Duff Islands (Pileni Taumako)
Taumako
Taumako
Tahua
Tohua
Bass Islands
Lua
Kaa
Loreva
Treasurer's Islands
Tuleki
Te Aku
Lakao
Ulaka
Hallie Jackson Reef
Tikopia
Anuta (Anua)
Fatutaka

See also

 Geography of Solomon Islands

References 

 

Solomon Islands
Islands